Nguyễn Xuân Hùng (born 1 February 1991) is a Vietnamese footballer who plays as a full-back for V.League 1 club Hồng Lĩnh Hà Tĩnh and the Vietnam national football team.

References 

1991 births
Living people
Vietnamese footballers
Association football fullbacks
V.League 1 players
Vietnam international footballers
Than Quang Ninh FC players